Liu Jianzhang (1910 – February 14, 2008) was a politician of the People's Republic of China and a former Minister of Railways of China.

References 

1910 births
2008 deaths
People's Republic of China politicians from Hebei
Politicians from Hengshui
Chinese Communist Party politicians from Hebei